Apple River Canyon State Park is an Illinois state park on  in Jo Daviess County, Illinois, United States.

The river canyon is part of the Driftless Area of Illinois, a region that was bypassed by the last ice age; "the glacial sweep which ironed out hills and filled valleys in other parts of the state left this area unscratched". During the dramatic events that surrounded the end of the last Ice Age, the Apple River, which once flowed eastward into the Pecatonica River, reversed its original course and began to flow southwest through an erosion gorge to the Mississippi. The result is a deep canyon, part of which is preserved in the Park. Loess covered the landscape and the soils that developed on it are mapped as Lacrescent silty clay loam and Dubuque silt loam.

The Apple River Canyon State Park, and the Land and Water Reserve within the park, offers hiking, fishing, and hunting on parcels of gorge land. There are several hiking trails through the woods with nice views of the river and bluffs, and a tent campground. Smallmouth bass live in the river.

See also
Millville Town Site

References

External links

State parks of Illinois
Lakes of Illinois
Protected areas of Jo Daviess County, Illinois
Driftless Area
Protected areas established in 1932
Rivers of Jo Daviess County, Illinois
1932 establishments in Illinois